Robyn Adair Meagher (born June 17, 1967) is a retired Canadian athlete competing in the middle and long-distance events. She represented her country at the 1992 and 1996 Summer Olympics, as well as three World Championships. In addition, she won a silver medal at the 1994 Commonwealth Games.

Nowadays, she works as a clinical counselor.

Competition record

Personal bests
Outdoor
800 metres – 2:05.02 (Richmond 1999)
1000 metres – 2:44.60 (Hamilton 1998)
1500 metres – 4:06.79 (Sherbrooke 1999)
Mile – 4:26.07 (Sheffield 1992)
3000 metres – 8:43.71 (Brussels 1992)
5000 metres – 15:21.15 (Turin 1992)

References

All-Athletics profile

1967 births
Living people
People from Antigonish, Nova Scotia
Sportspeople from Nova Scotia
Canadian female middle-distance runners
Canadian female long-distance runners
Athletes (track and field) at the 1992 Summer Olympics
Athletes (track and field) at the 1996 Summer Olympics
Athletes (track and field) at the 1990 Commonwealth Games
Athletes (track and field) at the 1994 Commonwealth Games
Olympic track and field athletes of Canada
Commonwealth Games medallists in athletics
Commonwealth Games silver medallists for Canada
Competitors at the 1990 Goodwill Games
Medallists at the 1994 Commonwealth Games